The Money Trap is a 1965 American crime drama film directed by Burt Kennedy, written by Walter Bernstein based on the novel of the same name by Lionel White, and starring Glenn Ford, Elke Sommer, and Rita Hayworth. The supporting cast features Ricardo Montalbán, Joseph Cotten, and James Mitchum.

Plot

Joe Baron (Glenn Ford) is an under-appreciated, under paid cop who lives a life of luxury because of his very wealthy, beautiful, and much younger wife, Lisa Baron (Elke Sommer), and the stock that her father left behind. Unfortunately, when their stock dividends stop coming in, Joe finds himself in some serious need of cash. To further heighten Joe's concerns, Lisa intimates she is unwilling to lower her standard of living.

Joe and his partner Pete Delanos (Ricardo Montalbán) are ordered to investigate a rich and well connected doctor, Horace Van Tilden (Joseph Cotten) who shot an intruder, Phil Kenny, in his home. At the crime scene, they find an open wall safe and the intruder laying on the floor but still breathing. Joe rides in the ambulance where Kenny says he was after two bags of cash with $500,000. He gives Joe the safe combination, and then dies. Joe keeps this to himself and continues his investigation.

Joe visits Phil Kenny's Wife, Rosalie Kenny (Rita Hayworth), a waitress in a bar who is a former girl friend. That night Lisa and Joe argue. Joe storms out and goes to Rosalie and they make love. Rosalie tells Joe that Van Tilden deals drugs and that Kenny was an addict. She validates Kenny's claim that he was after $500,000. Joe gives Rosalie some money and tells her to leave town. He returns home and Lisa apologizes for the night before.

Later, Pete tells Joe that he "wants in". Joe reluctantly agrees and shares his plan to steal Van Tilden's cash. To their surprise, Van Tilden wants to see them. Van Tilden explains he wants to give Rosalie money, but Joe feigns ignorance as to where she lives. Van Tilden mentions he will be in Acapulco for the week, leaving that day. Joe is suspicious but moves forward with the heist. Later, Joe and Pete are sent to a crime scene where they find Rosalie sprawled on the ground. A police officer says she was pushed from a rooftop. The next day, Pete checks to make sure Van Tilden has left for Acapulco.

That night, Joe and Pete enter Van Tilden's house where they encounter and knock unconscious Van Tilden's henchman Matthews. They blow open the safe but while grabbing the loot, Van Tilden and Matthews surprise them and Pete is shot. Joe incapacitates them and helps Pete to the car. Joe drives Pete to his house where he tells Lisa what happened. They discover one bag contains heroin. Pete's wound is life-threatening, and Joe offers Van Tilden the drugs in exchange for medical care for Pete. Van Tilden arrives at Joe's house alone per Joe's demand. Unbeknownst to Joe, Mattews has followed Van Tilden. During his treatment, Pete accuses Joe of selling him out. He grabs the money to leave, but succumbs to his wound. As Joe's part of the bargain, he must deliver the drugs to the Van Tilden. He and Van Tilden leave in Van Tilden's car followed by Matthews. They arrive at a closed drugstore and Joe tells Van Tilden to wait in the car while he retrieves the bag of heroin. Joe knocks on the door, an elderly man opens the door, and Joe asks for the bag he left earlier. It is clear the drugstore is in Joe's old neighborhood and the drugstore owner has known Joe since he was young. As the drugstore owner is about to hand Joe the bag, Matthews and Van Tilden enter with guns. Van Tilden orders Matthews to kill Joe and the drugstore owner as he leaves with the heroin. Joe shoots and kills Matthews. Outside, Joe sees Van Tilden driving off and fires several shots, hitting Van Tilden and causing his car to crash. As Van Tilden stumbles from the car, he and Joe shoot each other. Joe grabs his stomach and fires one final round into the prone Van Tilden.

When Joe arrives home, Lisa attempts to call an ambulance, Joe orders her to call the police instead. He illuminates his rear yard, swimming pool, and patio. As sirens are heard, Joe leans against the wall and awaits his fate in the arms of his wife.

Cast

 Glenn Ford as Joe Baron
 Elke Sommer as Lisa
 Rita Hayworth as Rosalie
 Ricardo Montalbán as Pete Delanos
 Joseph Cotten as Dr. Van Tilden
 James Mitchum as Detective Wolski
 Tom Reese as Matthews
 Fred Essleras Mr.Klein
 Eugene Iglesias as Father
 Teri Lynn Sandoval as Daughter
 William Campbell as Jack Archer (uncredited)
 Argentina Brunetti as Aunt

See also
List of American films of 1965

References

External links 
 

1965 films
1965 crime drama films
American crime drama films
Films directed by Burt Kennedy
Films with screenplays by Walter Bernstein
American police detective films
Films based on American novels
Metro-Goldwyn-Mayer films
American neo-noir films
1960s English-language films
1960s American films